Snezhny (masculine), Snezhnaya (feminine), or Snezhnoye (neuter) may refer to:
Snezhny, Russia (Snezhnaya, Snezhnoye), name of several rural localities in Russia
Snezhny, a ski resort in Korobitsyno, Leningrad Oblast, Russia
Snizhne (Snezhnoye), a city in Donetsk Oblast, Ukraine